Cinta Fitri is an Indonesian drama web series adapted from television series of the same title which aired on WeTV and iflix. Producted by MD Entertainment and Umbara Brothers Film. This web series is the first web series from Anggy Umbara. It starred Tissa Biani and Rizky Nazar. The series is also airing on Trans TV on 15 November 2021.

Plot 

Fitri has to struggle to survive in Jakarta after her dream of getting married ran aground due to the death of her future husband. Fitri's kindness was later paid off by her meeting with Farel; Jakarta man who later fell in love with her.

Cast

Main 
Tissa Biani as Fitri Rahayu
Rizky Nazar as Farel Emeraldi Hutama
Omar Daniel as Aldiansyah Armando/Aldo

Recurring
Dimas Anggara as Firmansyah Armando
Josephine Firmstone as Moza
Gemi Nastiti as Kayla Saphira Hutama
Lydia Kandou as Amelia Hutama
Willem Bevers as Hutama Erlangga
Jui Purwoto as Norman
Vonny Anggraini as Bulik 
Deden Bagaskara as Iman Armando
Sitha Soerjo as Asih
Yusuf Özkan as Yuga
Aliyah Khansa as Ratna

Special appearances 
Talitha Rasika as Farel's Secretary 
TB Alim as Joyo
Octa Viyanti as The neighbor's mother is jealous
Fauzan Jagur as Youth hanging out
Trio Albino as Youth hanging out
Dedi RBT as Thugs
Ari Goceng as Snatcher
Yanti Mbul as study mother
Redie Irsyad as Photographer
Melly Saripah as Retno
Florine Edhita as Lobby reception
Manoj Punjabi as Mister Mateo
Iqbaal Ramadhan as watchmaker
Indri Ade S as Receptionist
Nana Ken Sepriyanto as Locals
Rosita Simatupang as Moza's aunt
Kemal Al Giffari as Cahyo
Tomy Babap as Asep
Natasha Manapa as Intan
Irfan Supriyatna as Ivan
Rizzi Ahmad as Creative Director
Filia Farlinanda as Client
Alika Noer Zahra as Ivan's assistant
Fitri Cikarang as Assistant creative director
Aryo Wahab as Vendors
Ayu Wandira as Maid
Afan Sanjaya as Retro Security
Dina Al as Neighbor's mother
I Kadek Juniarta as Satay waiter
Dicky Yuro as IT employees
Anggy Umbara as Advertising director
Crys Edwards as porridge
Prima Satria W as Online motorcycle taxi drivers
Agay Suhandi as Villain
Ghea Austin Busra as Advertising star
Chandra Hasibuan as Father who got hit
Frederik Alexander as Chakra
Adi Chandra as Gunadi
Halao Fadlan as Designer
Ferry Ran as Rano
Bagus Septiawan as Valet parking
Vera Octarina as Flowers
Dicky Otoy as bricklayer
Bounty Umbara as Peanuts
Dimas Aditya as Customers
Indria Desha as Receptionist
Anugrah Ika as Meisha
Yans Bewok as Udin
Aryo Bimo as Waiter
Renka Surya as Moderator
Lut Faria as Jury
Ali Mensan as Deni
Dewi Ratna as beautiful girl
Yayan Ruhian as Shopkeeper
Faiz Vishal as Farel's rented keeper
Fauzan Tohir as Farel's neighbor
Ferry Anggriawan as Farel's neighbor
Navra Sakina Apple as Child Moza
Faiz Vishal as Meisha's Substitute
Vista Virmasari as Vela
Stefanus Otnilla as Artist
Agam Fajri as Ardi
Eka Zumrotun as Matoa employees
Ryzky Milan as Designer
Indra Gusti as Vito
Nisrina Artanti as greeter
Windi Nasir as Driver

Productions

Casting 
Tissa Biani was roped in to play Fitri. Rizky Nazar to play the role of Farel. Omar Daniel was chosen to play Aldo.

Promotion 
The first promo of this series was released on 15 September 2021.

Sountrack 
Atas Nama Cinta by Rossa from Cinta Fitri was recreated for the series with the same title by Tissa Biani.

Reception 
This series also successfully became a show that entered the ranks of "trending" in Malaysia and USA.

References

External links 
 

2021 web series debuts
2021 web series endings